Auto Destruct is a video game developed by the Swedish studio Neurostone and published by Electronic Arts. It was released for the PlayStation. The player takes on the role of a retired race car driver hunting down the fanatical cult which murdered his wife and daughter. The music was composed by English electronic producer Danny Briottet.

Gameplay
The player takes control of a futuristic car in 3-D urban environments and must accomplish a series of missions. Objectives vary widely, and include seek-and-destroy missions, escort missions, and taxicab driving.

Reception

Auto Destruct saw a range of opinions from critics. Next Generation said that the game sets itself apart from other vehicular combat games with its variety of missions, the depth added by its resource management elements, and most especially its detailed and expansive 3D city environments, which give the player unprecedented freedom. They criticized that the graphics look like a first generation PlayStation game and the music and sound effects are generic, and concluded that the game is "a good ride, but it could have been much more." Three of the four reviewers for Electronic Gaming Monthly similarly said that though the graphics have problems, the missions, resource management, and massive environments give Auto Destruct more depth and potentially more enjoyment than other vehicular combat games. They also praised the usefulness of the radar, and said the resources are balanced such that what the player needs is always just within reach, leaving only oneself to blame for failure. Only Shawn Smith deferred, saying the missions eventually start to all feel the same. Joe Smith of GameSpot, however, gave the reverse opinion, saying the graphics outshine those of other vehicular combat games, but the mission-based format drags the game down by restricting players to a very specific set of actions rather than letting them do what they want. He found the missions repetitive as well.

IGNs Adam Douglas shared Smith's opinion that the missions are unremarkable and repetitive, but agreed with other critics that the graphics are dated and unimpressive. However, he found the game enjoyable overall and gave it a mild recommendation: " It's not terribly original or exciting, but it gets the job done and is pretty entertaining to boot. If you're really into driving and shooting, give it a go. For anyone else, though, I'd suggest a rental session first." GamePro found the game adequate in most respects, with the exception of the music, which they described as "monotonous droning". They said the variety of missions is the game's standout feature, and like IGN they suggested that fans of the genre buy it and those who are simply curious should rent it first. The game held a 61% on the review aggregation website GameRankings based on five reviews.

In a retrospective review for Allgame, Shawn Sackenheim declared that "Auto Destruct is an astoundingly mediocre game. While it doesn't really do anything wrong, it just seems uninspired and run of the mill." He elaborated that the graphics look like those of a 1995 game, the missions are uninspired and all feel the same, and the music and sound effects are average and standard.

Notes

References

External links
 

1997 video games
Electronic Arts games
PlayStation (console) games
PlayStation (console)-only games
Shooter video games
Video games developed in Sweden
Video games about cults